, is a Japanese French origin actor and musician from Tokyo. His mother is Japanese and his father is French. His most notable roles to date are as Kitazaki/Dragon Orphnoch in the 2003 series Kamen Rider 555 and Rei Suzumura/ZERO the Silver Fanged Knight in the 2006 series GARO. He is also the lead vocalist of the band Dustz.

Filmography

Television
Kamen Rider 555 (2003) – Kitazaki/Dragon Orphnoch; (Kamen Rider Delta)
Ougon Kishi GARO (2005–2006) – Rei Suzumura/Silver Fanged Knight ZERO
Princess Princess D (2006) – Yūjirō Shihōdani
Garo Special: Byakuya no Maju (2006) – Rei Suzumura/Silver Fanged Knight ZERO
Senjou no Girls Life (2007) – Takuto
Fuuma no Kojirou (2007) – Kousuke Mibu
RH Plus (2008) – Haruka Konoe
Garo: Makai Senki (2011) – Rei Suzumura/Silver Fanged Knight ZERO
Zero: Black Blood (2014) – Rei Suzumura/Silver Fanged Knight ZERO
Zero: Dragon Blood (2017) – Rei Suzumura/Silver Fanged Knight ZERO

Cinema
Akogare no Hito (2004) – Satoshi
Itoshii Koto Dekinai (2007) – Shin (Visual Boy)
Crazy Crown (2007) – Ranmaru Mori
Arakure Knight (2007) – Igeki
Hard Revenge, Milly: Bloody Battle (2009)
Maebashi Visual-Kei (2011)
"Borderline" (2017) - Aberu Wagatsuma
"Double Drive: Ookami no Okite" (2018) - Aberu Wagatsuma
"Double Drive: Ryuu no Kizuna" (2018) - Aberu Wagatsuma

Music

Fujita is the lead vocalist of the band Dustz, under the pseudonym Takuto. He has also released in-character CD singles and participated in band projects with co-stars, such as GARO Project, as part of his acting roles.

{| class="wikitable" width="75%"
! Release date || Title || Artist
|-
| July 2006 ||  || GARO Project (Ray Fujita with Ryōsei Konishi, Mikka Hijii, Masaki Kyomoto and Hiroyuki Watanabe)
|-
| August 2006 ||  || Hime (Ray Fujita with Kenta Kamakari and Takeru Satoh) 
|-
| October 2006 ||  || Dustz 
|-
| November 2006 ||  || GARO Project
|-
| November 2006 ||  || Ray Fujita as Yūjirō Shihōdani
|-
| January 2007 || || Dustz 
|-
| March 2008 ||"Future" || Dustz 
|-
| May 2009 ||"Break & Peace" || Dustz 
|-
| October 2011 ||"Brilliant Day" || Dustz  
|-
| April 2011 ||"Criez" || Dustz 
|-
| August 2011 ||"Spiral" || Dustz 
|-
| December 2011 ||"TROIS" || Dustz 
|}

Other mediaPhotobooks'''

  (August 2006)
  (October 2006)
   (January 2007）
  (March 2007)

References

External links
 FujitaRay.com - Official website 
  Official blog 

1988 births
Japanese male television actors
Japanese people of French descent
Singers from Tokyo
Living people
21st-century Japanese singers
21st-century Japanese male singers